Fukahori Tameike Dam is an earthfill dam located in Shimane Prefecture in Japan. The dam is used for irrigation. The dam impounds about 2  ha of land when full and can store 115 thousand cubic meters of water. The construction of the dam was completed in 1993.

References

Dams in Shimane Prefecture
1993 establishments in Japan